The siege of Manzikert in 1054 was a successful defense of the city of Manzikert by Byzantine forces under Basil Apokapes against the Seljuk Turks led by Toğrül.

Siege 
Toğrül besieged Manzikert for thirty days using all sorts of siege machines but the city held. A historical account cited the successful defense against the Seljuks use of light type of tortoises, the mobile shelters that protected men and siege weapons from missile fire. Basil is said to have stored sharpened large beams, which were thrown at the advancing tortoises, overturning them in the process. The city itself was able to withstand the onslaught due to its triple wall and access to spring water.

Seventeen years later, the Turks would experience greater success against Romanus Diogenes under Alp Arslan at the same place, with the city falling alongside the famous Byzantine defeat in 1071.

References

Manzikert 1054
Manzikert 1054
1050s in the Byzantine Empire
Conflicts in 1054
1054 in Asia
Sieges of the Byzantine–Seljuk wars
11th century in the Seljuk Empire